California dandelion may refer to:

 Taraxacum californicum, a small endangered flower of southern California
 Agoseris grandiflora, a large flower of western North America